Blažej Vaščák (born 21 November 1983) is a Slovak football midfielder who last played for Dukla Banská Bystrica.

Career
Vaščák started his professional career with Slovakian side Košice. With the club he made 16 appearances in two season. In 2003, he moved to AS Trenčín, and in just six months scored one goal in a total of 14 appearances. Following an impressive spell, he moved to Artmedia Petržalka and would score nine goals in 57 appearances over the course of two seasons. He then moved to Italy with Serie A side Treviso. In his first season with the club, they were relegated to Serie B. He would maintain a starting spot and score 5 goals in just over 30 appearances. In 2007, he moved to fellow Serie B side Lecce for €600,000 in co-ownership deal, making 12 appearances and scoring once. In June 2007 Lecce bought him outright for undisclosed fee. He was loaned out to Cesena the following season and made 29 starts. Following a less than perfect spell in Italy, the 24-year-old moved to the Czech Republic to play for Teplice. Vaščák made his Gambrinus liga debut on 29 March 2009, against Příbram and he overall played 7 matches for Teplice and came back to Lecce.

Vaščák terminated the contract with Lecce in mutual consent in July 2009.

In September 2009, he returned to Košice as a free agent. After a season at Košice, Vaščák joined the Polish side Polonia Bytom in the summer of 2011. He left the club a year later. In March 2012, Vaščák became a player of the 3. liga team Partizán Bardejov. He scored two goals on his debut in a 5–0 win at home to Sokol Dolná Ždaňa. Vaščák spent the following season on loan at ŽP Šport Podbrezová, signing permanently for the club in the summer of 2013.

References

External links
 
 Player profile at official club website
 
 
  
 

1983 births
Living people
People from Krompachy
Sportspeople from the Košice Region
Slovak footballers
Slovak expatriate footballers
Slovakia international footballers
FC VSS Košice players
FC Steel Trans Ličartovce players
FC Petržalka players
Treviso F.B.C. 1993 players
U.S. Lecce players
A.C. Cesena players
FK Teplice players
Polonia Bytom players
Partizán Bardejov players
FK Železiarne Podbrezová players
FC Lokomotíva Košice players
MFK Skalica players
FK Senica players
MFK Zemplín Michalovce players
FK Dukla Banská Bystrica players
Slovak Super Liga players
2. Liga (Slovakia) players
Serie A players
Serie B players
Ekstraklasa players
Slovak expatriate sportspeople in Poland
Slovak expatriate sportspeople in the Czech Republic
Expatriate footballers in Poland
Expatriate footballers in Italy
Expatriate footballers in the Czech Republic
Association football midfielders